Target Earth may refer to:

 Target Earth (video game), the video game also known as Assault Suits Leynos
 Target Earth (film), a 1954 Science Fiction B-Movie
 Target Earth (album), a 2013 album by Voivod 
Target Earth, a 1998 TV-Movie starring Christopher Meloni and Marcia Cross